Francisco José Veiga Rodríguez (born 1958 in Madrid) is a Spanish historian, journalist and writer. He is a doctor and professor in the Department of Contemporary History at the Autonomous University of Barcelona (UAB), where he has been a professor since 1983, with a focus on Eastern Europe, the countries of the former Soviet Union, the countries of the Balkan Peninsula and Turkey. He is an author of newspaper articles for El Periódico de Catalunya and El País.

Biography
His historiographical production has dealt with subjects such as the Interwar period (1918-1939), the Cold War (1948-1991), the "Post-Cold War" (1991-2008), the theory of the crises arose after the fall of the Ottoman Empire and the resurgence of nationalism and the extreme right. He has written articles for the newspaper Avui (1987-1989), El Observador de la Actualidad (1990-1993) and above all for the El Periódico and El País, where he has been publishing various chronicles on the Romanian revolution of 1989, the Yugoslav Wars (1991-2001), the political transition in the Balkan Peninsula and in Turkey, discussing latter's candidacy as a candidate for the enlargement of the European Union. He is also co-author of a study on the Arab Spring through his experience in Yemen, of a history of the Russian revolution and has coordinated a collective work on the new role of Eurasia in world geostrategy.

Work

Essays and studies

References

Bibliography 
 
 
 
 
 

1958 births
Living people
Writers from Madrid
Contemporary historians
20th-century Spanish historians
21st-century Spanish historians
Academic staff of the Autonomous University of Barcelona